Not Necessarily Acoustic is a live album recorded on Steve Howe's first solo tour and released in 1994.

Track listing 
All songs written by Steve Howe except where noted.

 "The Valley of Rocks" – 3:03
 "Heritage" – 2:32
 "Arada" (Federico Moreno Tórroba; arr. Howe) – 1:08
 "Country Mix - a. White Silver Sands  b. Green Bay Polka  c. Steel Guitar Rag  d. Darling, Je Vous Aime Beaucoup  e. Blue Steel Blues" (a. Charles "Red" Mathews, b. Traditional, c. Leon McAuliffe, Cliff Stone, Merle Travis, d. Anna Sosenko, e. Ted Daffan) – 2:57
 "Excerpts from Tales from Topographic Oceans" (Jon Anderson, Howe, Chris Squire, Rick Wakeman, Alan White) – 9:18
 "Bareback" – 2:42
 "Sketches in the Sun" – 2:58
 "Cactus Boogie" – 2:09
 "Second Initial" – 2:47
 "Corkscrew" – 3:45
 "The Glory of Love" (Billy Hill) – 1:14
 "Dorothy" – 2:10
 "Meadow Rag" – 2:26
 "Concerto In D. 2nd Movement" (Vivaldi; arr. Howe) – 2:34
 "Surface Tension" - 3:22
 "Masquerade" – 2:03
 "Mood for a Day" – 2:59
 "Swedish Rhapsody No. 1" (Hugo Alfvén) – 0:53
 "Whispering" (Vincent Rose, John Schoenberger, Richard Coburn) – 1:00
 "Roundabout" (Anderson, Howe) – 2:33
 "Ram" – 1:51
 "Clap" – 3:43

Personnel 
 Steve Howe – Scharpach 6-string acoustic (tracks 1, 4, 8, 9, 11, 20, 21, 22); Martin 12-string acoustic (tracks 7, 16); Kohno Model 10 classical guitar (tracks 2, 3, 5, 10, 14, 15, 17); Steinberger 6-string electric (tracks 6, 12, 13, 18, 19)
 Toby Alington – editing, mixing
 Roger Dean – graphic design, design, paintings, logo, logo design
 Doug Gottlieb – liner notes
 Tim Handley – post production
 Simon Pressey – engineer
 Miki Slingsby – photography
 Mark Stratford – production coordination
 Dave Wilkerson – engineer, liner notes
 Produced by Steve Howe

References 

Steve Howe (musician) albums
Albums with cover art by Roger Dean (artist)
1994 live albums